Gerhard "Gary" Lux (born 26 January 1959) is a Canadian-born Austrian singer, most famous for having represented his country in the Eurovision Song Contest on six occasions.

Career
Lux has released solo albums entitled "Dreidimensional" and "City of Angels" inspired by some time he had spent in Los Angeles.

Lux performed for Austria on the following occasions:
1983 as a member of Westend performing "Hurricane"
1984 providing backing for Anita performing "Einfach weg"
1985 as a solo artist performing "Kinder dieser Welt"
1987 as a solo artist performing "Nur noch Gefühl"
1993 providing backing for Tony Wegas performing "Maria Magdalena"
1995 providing backing for Stella Jones performing "Die Welt dreht sich verkehrt"

As a composer, Lux was placed second in the Austrian national heat for Eurovision in 1994 with the song "Solitaire" performed by Three Girl Madhouse. Gary also sang a duet with Gitti Seuberth at the 1984 Austrian final Komm hoit mi which placed 2nd.

Personal life
He was born in Ontario, Canada but returned to live in Austria with his parents as a young boy. He was married to Marianne (died of cancer on 4 April 2011) and has 2 sons, Benny and Dennis.

Sources 

 Site about Eurovision Song Contest
 Entries for Gary Lux

Eurovision Song Contest entrants for Austria
Eurovision Song Contest entrants of 1983
Eurovision Song Contest entrants of 1985
Eurovision Song Contest entrants of 1987
Canadian people of Austrian descent
20th-century Austrian male singers
Living people
1959 births
Musicians from Ontario